The 2018 Roller Hockey Women's Intercontinental Cup is the first edition of the roller hockey tournament known as the Women's Intercontinental Cup, endorsed by World Skate. It was held in the Estadio Aldo Cantoni in San Juan, Argentina.

It was played together with the men's tournament.

Format
The tournament was a knockout competition in a final four format; four teams entered, with the host selected after the teams became known. Entered the tournament the from the 2017–18 Euroleague finalists and the South American Club Championship/Pan-American Club Championship finalists of the 2018.

Teams

Matches
In all matches, extra time and a penalty shootout were used to decide the winner if necessary.

Bracket

Semi-finals

Final

References

2018 in women's roller hockey
FIRS Intercontinental Cup
International roller hockey competitions hosted by Spain